A by-election was held for the Australian House of Representatives seat of Robertson on 5 December 1964. It was triggered by the resignation of Liberal MP Roger Dean.

The by-election was won by Liberal candidate William Bridges-Maxwell.

Results

References

1964 elections in Australia
New South Wales federal by-elections
December 1964 events in Australia